Michael Oien (born 13 August 1981 in Silver Spring, Maryland) is an American musician and composer living in New York City.  Oien plays the acoustic bass and released his debut album And Now in 2015 on Fresh Sound Records.

References

External links
 Official Website

1981 births
American jazz musicians
American jazz double-bassists
Male double-bassists
American jazz composers
American male jazz composers
Living people
21st-century double-bassists
21st-century American male musicians